Zhou Gaoping (born October 20, 1986 in Taizhou, Jiangsu) is a female Chinese football player who competed for the national team in the 2008 Summer Olympics. Her position is that of defender.

Major performances
2007 World Cup - Quarterfinals;
2008 Asian Cup - 2nd

References
http://2008teamchina.olympic.cn/index.php/personview/personsen/1741
https://web.archive.org/web/20080810232621/http://results.beijing2008.cn/WRM/ENG/BIO/Athlete/4/236624.shtml

1986 births
Living people
Chinese women's footballers
China women's international footballers
Footballers at the 2008 Summer Olympics
2007 FIFA Women's World Cup players
Olympic footballers of China
People from Taizhou, Jiangsu
Footballers from Jiangsu
Footballers at the 2010 Asian Games
Women's association football defenders
Asian Games competitors for China